= Group Otte =

Group Otte, also called the Brunswick Group or Braunschweiger Gruppe, was the name given to a group of five German neo-Nazis, by law enforcement, after the group's leader Paul Otte carried out two bombings on courthouses in 1977: one in Flensburg, another in Hanover. The group targeted courts to intimidate and disrupt lawsuits against neo-Nazi groups.

== Trial ==
Paul Otte, Volker Heidel, Oliver Schreiber, Wolfgang Sachse and Hans-Dieter Lepizien were tried in Braunschweig, Germany in 1980. In 1981 all five members received prison sentences between three and six years.
